Stan and Judy's Kid is the fourth studio album by Adam Sandler. It was nominated for the 2000 Grammy Award for Best Spoken Comedy Album. By selling 80,889 units in its opening week, it set the record for the highest first week of sales of a comedy recording. The sales numbers were achieved without the promotional push of a radio single or video. As of 2009, it has been certified gold, having sold over 500,000 copies in the US.

Track listing

Tracks in bold are songs.

"The Peeper" was made into a flash cartoon, which is readily available on the Internet. It launched over the Labor Day weekend as a promotion for the CD and was watched by over 1 million users during that period, one of the most watched video clips on the internet at the time. "Whitey" had a spin-off film in 2002 called Eight Crazy Nights.
"The Psychotic Legend of Uncle Donnie" also had a spin-off film in 2012 called That's My Boy.

Personnel
Adam Sandler – main performer, vocals, guitar, producer
Allen Covert – performer, backing vocals, producer
Earl Martin – performer, digital editing
DJ Nu-Mark – DJ Scratches
Rob Schneider – performer
Peter Dante – performer
George Wallace – performer
Blake Clark – performer
Drew Barrymore – performer
Maxi Anderson – backing vocals
Alex Brown – backing vocals
Natalie Jackson – backing vocals
Teddy Castellucci – guitar
Gary Foster – guitar
Jim Fox – guitar
Chuck Berghofer – bass
Mike Lang – piano
Aaron Zigman – synthesizer
Gene Cipriano – saxophone
Dan Higgins – saxophone
Nino Tempo – saxophone
Bill Elton – trombone
Ken Kugler – trombone
Chauncey Welsch – trombone
Rick Baptist – trumpet
Wayne Bergeron – trumpet
George Graham – trumpet
Warren Luening – trumpet
Greg Field – drums
Don Heffington – drums
Ray Ellis – arranger, conductor
Brooks Arthur – producer, photography
L. Mo Weber – producer, mixing
Jolie Levine-Aller – production coordination
Brian Dixon – assistant engineer
Wil Donovan – assistant engineer
John Hendrickson – assistant engineer
Tulio Torrinello, Jr. – assistant engineer
Stephen Marcussen – mastering
Gabe Veltri – mixing, recording
Rich Breen – digital editing
Ted Lobinger – digital editing
Stewart Whitmore – digital editing
Chris McCann – photography

Charts

Certifications

References 

Adam Sandler albums
1999 albums
Warner Records albums
Albums recorded at Brandeis University
Albums produced by Brooks Arthur
1990s comedy albums